The World Hot Air Ballooning Championships are the FAI World Hot Air Balloon Championship and the FAI Women's World Hot Air Balloon Championship. These biennial events for hot air ballooning are conducted under the direction of the FAI Ballooning Commission (CIA or Comité International d'Aérostation).

Championships

FAI World Hot Air Balloon Championship

FAI Women's World Hot Air Balloon Championship

All-time medal table
Updated after the 2018 World Championships.

See also 
 World Junior Hot Air Ballooning Championships
 European Hot Air Balloon Championships

References

External links 
 FAI Ballooning Commission (CIA)
 23rd FAI World Hot Air Balloon Championship
 3rd FAI Women's World Hot Air Balloon Championship

Ballooning, Hot Air
Ballooning competitions